Hjørdis Høsøien is a Norwegian handball player. She played 54 matches for the Norway women's national handball team between 1966 and 1975.  She participated at the 1973 and 1975 World Women's Handball Championship.

References

Year of birth missing (living people)
Possibly living people
Norwegian female handball players